Surazh is a town and the administrative center of Surazhsky District in Bryansk Oblast, Russia, located on the Iput River  southwest of Bryansk, the administrative center of the oblast. Population:     1,599 (1897).

History
It was first mentioned in the 17th century as the village of Surazhichi; later as a sloboda. Since 1781 it has been known as the town of Surazh-na-Iputi, and since 1797—as simply Surazh.

Jews apparently first settled in Surazh in the first half of the 18th century. In 1897 the Jewish population of Surazh of 2,398 comprised 60 percent of the total population. The Jews of Surazh suffered from pogroms in October 1905 and at the end of winter and in the spring of 1917. In 1918 a pogrom was carried out in Surazh by Red Army soldiers. In 1939 the 2,052 Jews of Surazh comprised about 23 percent of the total population. The town was occupied by the Germans on August 17, 1941. The Jews were forced into a ghetto after which the homes they left were damaged and then burned. In March 1942 all the ghetto inmates were shot near Kislovka village.
Surazh was liberated by the Red Army on September 25, 1943.

Administrative and municipal status
Within the framework of administrative divisions, Surazh serves as the administrative center of Surazhsky District. As an administrative division, it is incorporated within Surazhsky District as Surazhsky Urban Administrative Okrug. As a municipal division, Surazhsky Urban Administrative Okrug is incorporated within Surazhsky Municipal District as Surazhskoye Urban Settlement.

Ecological problems 
As a result of the Chernobyl disaster on April 26, 1986, part of the territory of Bryansk Oblast has been contaminated with radionuclides (mainly Gordeyevsky, Klimovsky, Klintsovsky, Krasnogorsky, Surazhsky, and Novozybkovsky Districts). In 1999, some 226,000 people lived in areas with the contamination level above 5 Curie/km2, representing approximately 16% of the oblast's population.

References

Notes

Sources

External links
 The murder of the Jews of Surazh during World War II, at Yad Vashem website.

Cities and towns in Bryansk Oblast
Surazhsky Uyezd
Smolensk Voivodeship
Holocaust locations in Russia